Haemadipsa interrupta is a hermatophagous terrestrial leech found in the Malay Peninsula. It was described by John Percy Moore.

Ecology and behavior
Haemadipsa interrupta occur on the ground in moist forests. They are fast and aggressive, feeding on a variety of prey by attaching themselves to the feet of passers-by.

Description
Haemadipsa interrupta are distinctive by having their median dorsal stripe being broken into a series of dashes.

References

External links
 
 

Leeches
Parasitic protostomes
Invertebrates of Malaysia
Animals described in 1935